Miriam Blasco Soto (born 12 December 1963) is a professional judo competitor, who resides in Alicante, Spain.  She competed at the 1992 Summer Olympics in Barcelona, Spain where she won the gold medal in Women's Judo in the 56 kg division.  One of the major streets in her native city of Alicante, La Avenida Miriam Blasco, was named after her.

When her professional sport career finished, she became actively involved in politics. In 2000, 2004, and 2008, she was elected to the Spanish Senate for the Partido Popular (right-wing).

She is married to Nicola Fairbrother, her opponent in the Olympics' final match.

References

External links
 
 
 

1963 births
Living people
Sportspeople from Valladolid
Spanish female judoka
Olympic judoka of Spain
Judoka at the 1992 Summer Olympics
Olympic gold medalists for Spain
Olympic medalists in judo
Medalists at the 1992 Summer Olympics
LGBT judoka
Spanish LGBT sportspeople
20th-century Spanish women